John Plumb (6 February 1927 – 6 April 2008) was an English abstract painter who emerged in Britain after World War II.

Plumb was born in Luton, England and he attended the Byam Shaw School of Art in London at the age of 20. He also studied at the Luton School of Art (1942–45), Byam Shaw School of Art in London (1948–50), and the Central School of Art and Design in London (1952–55), with Victor Pasmore and William Turnbull. He then taught at the Luton School of Art (1955–61), the Maidstone College of Art (1961–66), Bennington College (Vermont, United States, 1968–69), and then became Senior Lecturer in Painting at the Central School of Art and Design (1969–1982).

John Plumb's works reflected his admiration for American Color Field painting and hard-edge painting. In the mid-1960s, Plumb produced paintings with large fields of a single colour, including narrow strips on the edge of different colours, intended to enhance the emotional impact of the central, major, and usually intense hue optically.

While studying in London, Plumb married Joan Lawrence, a long-time close friend. He died aged 81.

References

Further reading

</ref>

1927 births
2008 deaths
People from Luton
Alumni of the Central School of Art and Design
Academics of the Central School of Art and Design
20th-century British painters
British male painters
Abstract painters
20th-century British male artists